In political science, the waves of democracy are major surges of democracy that have occurred in history. Although the term appears at least as early as 1887, it was popularized by Samuel P. Huntington, a political scientist at Harvard University, in his article published in the Journal of Democracy and further expounded in his 1991 book, The Third Wave: Democratization in the Late Twentieth Century. Democratization waves have been linked to sudden shifts in the distribution of power among the great powers, which created openings and incentives to introduce sweeping domestic reforms.

Scholars debate the precise number of democratic waves. Huntington describes three waves: the first "slow" wave of the 19th century, a second wave after World War II, and a third wave beginning in the mid-1970s in southern Europe, followed by Latin America and Asia. Though his book does not discuss the collapse of the Soviet bloc, a number of scholars have taken the "Third Wave" to include the democratic transitions of 1989–1991. Other scholars, such as Seva Gunitsky of the University of Toronto, have referred to thirteen waves from the 18th century to the Arab Spring (2011–2012).

Definition
In his 1991 book, The Third Wave, Huntington defined a democratic wave as "a group of transitions from nondemocratic to democratic regimes that occur within a specified period of time and that significantly outnumber transitions in the opposite directions during that period of time." (Huntington 1991, 15)

Mainwaring and Aníbal Pérez-Liñán (2014, 70) offer a similar definition: "any historical period during which there is a sustained and significant increase in the proportion of competitive regimes (democracies and semi-democracies)."

Gunitsky (2018) defines a democratic wave as a clustering of attempted or successful democratic transitions, coupled with linkages among the transitions in that cluster.

Huntington's three waves

First wave
The first wave of democracy (1828–1926) began in the early 19th century when suffrage was granted to the majority of white males in the United States ("Jacksonian democracy").  This was followed by France, Britain, Canada, Australia, Italy, and Argentina, and a few others, before 1900.  At its peak, after the breakup of the Russian, German, Austrian, and Ottoman empires in 1918, the first wave saw 29 democracies in the world. Reversal began in 1922, when Benito Mussolini rose to power in Italy.  The collapse primarily hit newly formed democracies, which could not stand against the aggressive rise of expansionist communist, fascist, and militaristic authoritarian or totalitarian movements that systematically rejected democracy. The nadir of the first wave came in 1942, when the number of democracies in the world dropped to a mere twelve.

Second wave
The second wave began following the Allied victory in World War II, and crested nearly twenty years later, in 1962, with 36 recognised democracies in the world. The second wave ebbed as well at this point, and the total number dropped to thirty democracies between 1962 and the mid-1970s. But the "flat line" would not last for long, as the third wave was about to surge in a way no one had ever seen.

Scholars have noted that the appearance of "waves" of democracy largely vanishes when women's suffrage is taken into account. Moreover, some countries change their positions quite dramatically: Switzerland, which is typically included as part of the first wave, did not grant women the right to vote until 1971.

Third wave
The third wave began with the 1974 Carnation Revolution in Portugal and the late-1970s Spanish transition to democracy. This was followed by the historic democratic transitions in Latin America in the 1980s, Asia-Pacific countries (Philippines, South Korea, and Taiwan) from 1986 to 1988, Eastern Europe after the collapse of the Soviet Union, and sub-Saharan Africa, beginning in 1989. The expansion of democracy in some regions was stunning. In Latin America, only Colombia, Costa Rica, and Venezuela were democratic by 1978, and only Cuba and Haiti remained authoritarian by 1995, when the wave had swept across twenty countries.

Huntington points out that three-fourths of the new democracies were Roman Catholic; most Protestant countries already were democratic. He emphasizes the Vatican Council of 1962, which turned the Church from defenders of the old established order into an opponent of totalitarianism.

Countries undergoing or having undergone a transition to democracy during a wave are sometimes subject to democratic backsliding. Political scientists and theorists believe that the third wave has crested and will soon begin to ebb, just as its predecessors did in the first and second waves. In the period immediately following the onset of the "war on terror" after the 11 September 2001 attacks on the United States, some backsliding ensued. How significant or lasting that erosion is remains a subject of debate. Third-wave countries, including Portugal, Spain, South Korea, and Taiwan, have become fully consolidated democracies rather than backsliding. As of 2020, they even had stronger democracies than many counterparts with a much longer history as democratic countries.

Arab Spring
Experts have associated the collapse of several dictatorships in the Middle East and North Africa, a phenomenon known as the Arab Spring, with the events that followed the fall of the Soviet Union in Eastern Europe. The similarity between the two phenomena inspired hope for a fourth wave of democratization. However, a few months after the apparent beginning of the transition, most of the Arab political openings closed, causing an inevitable pull-back. One of the most alarming cases was that of Egypt, where the government, controlled by the military, did not facilitate the democratic transition in any way. On the contrary, it strove to silence revolt by arresting peaceful protesters and by trying them in military tribunals. A concrete example is provided by the story of Maikel Nabil, an Egyptian blogger convicted and sentenced to three years in prison for "insulting the military establishment". The main causes of the regression and crisis in all the affected countries are attributed to corruption, unemployment, social injustice, and autocratic political systems.

Despite the apparently unsolvable situation, the UN, under the administration of Ban Ki-moon, tried to work as a mediator between the governments and the protesters. Larry Diamond has claimed that the role of the United States in the democratic transition of the Arab world was fundamental.

Digital media played a large role in creating favorable conditions for uprisings, helped to publicize key igniting events, and then facilitated those uprisings and their diffusion. But digital media did not do this alone or as suddenly as some observers have claimed. The story of the Arab Spring, according to Howard and Hussain, began over a decade ago as internet access and mobile phones began to diffuse rapidly through North Africa and the Middle East. The citizens that could afford internet access, the wealthy and powerful, mostly, played a huge role in the Egypt, Tunisia, and Bahrain uprisings. Over time, online criticism of regimes became more public and common, setting the stage for the Arab Spring. Digital media also allowed women and minorities to enter political discussions, and ultimately, the ensuing protests and revolutions as well.

Whether or not the Arab Spring counts as a distinct democratic wave is challenged by scholars on empirical grounds, as Tunisia is the only Arab Spring nation that successfully consolidated into a semi-stable democratic state following its uprising (according to the democracy-evaluating organization Freedom House, as of 2020).

Post-2019 protests
Since 2019, worldwide protests have energized democracy movements, focusing on racial equality, human rights, freedom, democracy, and social justice.
 2018–2022 Arab protests
 2019–2020 Hong Kong protests
 2020–2021 Belarusian protests
 2019–2022 Chilean protests
 2019–2020 Iranian protests, 2021–2022 Iranian protests, Mahsa Amini protests
 2020–2021 Thai protests
 2021–2023 Myanmar protests
 George Floyd protests
 Protests against responses to the COVID-19 pandemic, 2022 COVID-19 protests in China
 2022 Kazakh protests
 2022 Sri Lankan protests

Other waves
In a 2018 study in Perspectives on Politics, Seva Gunitsky of the University of Toronto identifies thirteen waves of democracy. His main criterion is rejection of absolute rule. By contrast, Huntington used the much narrower criterion of voting rights for the majority of men.

 The Atlantic Wave (1776–1798)
 The Latin American wars of independence (1809–1824)
 The First Constitutional Wave (1820–1821)
 The Romantic-Nationalist Wave (1830–1831)
 The Spring of Nations (1848)
 The Second Constitutional Wave (1905–1912)
 The post-WWI Wave (1919–1922)
 The post-WWII Wave (1945–1950)
 The African Decolonization Wave (1956–1968)
 The Modernization Wave, also known as the "Third" Wave (1974–1988)
 The Post-Soviet Wave (1989–1992)
 The Color Revolutions (2000–2007)
 The Arab Spring (2011–2012)

See also
 History of democracy

References

Further reading
 Diamond,  Larry.  Ill Winds: Saving Democracy from Russian Rage, Chinese Ambition, and American Complacency (2019)
 excerpted in Diamond, "The Global Crisis of Democracy: As China and Russia attack free governments and push strongman rule, the U.S. has gone silent—and a new tide of authoritarianism is gathering"  Wall Street Journal May 17, 2019
 Diamond,  Larry. "Facing up to the democratic recession." Journal of Democracy 26.1 (2015): 141–155. Online
 Huntington, Samuel P.  "Democracy's third wave." Journal of democracy 2.2 (1991): 12–34. online
 Huntington, Samuel P. "After twenty years: the future of the third wave." Journal of democracy 8.4 (1997): 3–12. online
 Huntington, Samuel P. The third wave: Democratization in the late twentieth century (U of Oklahoma Press, 1993).
 Mainwaring, Scott and Fernando Bizzarro. "The Fates of Third-Wave Democracies" Journal of Democracy 30#1 (January 2019), pp. 99–113 Online
 Martell, Luke. "The third wave in globalization theory." International Studies Review 9.2 (2007): 173–196. online
 
 John Markoff, Waves of Democracy: Social Movements and Political Change, Second Edition (2015).
 Puddington, Arch, and Tyler Roylance. "The Freedom House survey for 2016: the dual threat of populists and autocrats." Journal of Democracy 28.2 (2017): 105–119. online
 Schenkkan, Nate, and Sarah Repucci. "The Freedom House Survey for 2018: Democracy in Retreat" Journal of Democracy 30#2 (April 2019) pp. 100–114 online
 Zagorski,  Paul. W. "Democratic Breakdown in Paraguay and Venezuela: The Shape of Things to Come from Latin America?," Armed Forces & Society 30#1 (2003): 87–116

Democracy
Democratization